The Journal of Adolescent & Adult Literacy is a peer-reviewed academic journal published six times per year by Wiley-Blackwell. The current editors are Kathleen A. Hinchman (Syracuse University) and Kelly Chandler-Olcott (Syracuse University). The journal is one of three journals published on behalf of the International Literacy Association. The journal covers "practical, classroom-tested ideas grounded in research and theory." The Journal of Adolescent & Adult Literacy was first printed under the title Journal of Developmental Reading in 1957, but the name was changed to the Journal of Reading (ISSN 0022-4103) in 1964 starting with Volume 8. The name was changed again in 1995 to the current title.

According to the Journal Citation Reports, the journal has a 2011 impact factor of 0.728, ranking it 102nd out of 203 journals in the category "Education & Educational Research".

References

External links 
 

Adult education
Literacy
Wiley-Blackwell academic journals
Publications established in 1957
Education journals
English-language journals
Bimonthly journals